Taebaek Racing Park Is a racing circuit located in Taebaek, Gangwon Province, South Korea.

Overview 
In South Korea, it is the second oldest circuit after Everland Speedway, and is the country's first FIA official circuit.

Mainly, "Superrace Championship" (old GT Korea Championship) races are held, and Japanese racing teams participating in super endurance in have also held a special battle there.

References

Motorsport venues in South Korea
Sports venues in Gangwon Province, South Korea